Mandy Islacker (born 8 August 1988) is a German footballer who plays for 1. FC Köln. She is the daughter of Frank Islacker and the granddaughter of Franz Islacker.

International career
Islacker was part of the squad for the 2016 Summer Olympics, where Germany won the gold medal.

International goals
Scores and results list Germany's goal tally first:

Source:

Honours

1. FFC Frankfurt
UEFA Women's Champions League: 2014–15
Bundesliga top scorer: 2015–16, 2016–17

FCR Duisburg
Bundesliga runner-up: 2004–05, 2005–06

Bayern Munich
Bundesliga runner-up: 2008–09, 2017–18, 2018–19, 2019–20

Germany
Summer Olympic Games gold medal: 2016

References

External links

1988 births
Living people
German women's footballers
Germany women's international footballers
FCR 2001 Duisburg players
SGS Essen players
FC Bayern Munich (women) players
1. FFC Frankfurt players
Footballers at the 2016 Summer Olympics
Footballers from Essen
Olympic gold medalists for Germany
Olympic medalists in football
Medalists at the 2016 Summer Olympics
Frauen-Bundesliga players
Women's association football forwards
Olympic footballers of Germany
1. FC Köln (women) players
UEFA Women's Euro 2017 players